The 35th South American Junior Championships in Athletics were held
at the Estadio Modelo in Guayaquil, Ecuador from June 7–8, 2003.

Participation (unofficial)
Detailed result lists can be found on the "World Junior Athletics History" website.  An unofficial count yields the number of about 230 athletes from about 12 countries:  Argentina (21), Bolivia (4), Brazil (68), Chile (37), Colombia (20), Ecuador (34), Guyana (1), Panama (2), Paraguay (2), Peru (10), Uruguay (4), Venezuela (27).

Medal summary
Medal winners are published for men and women
Complete results can be found on the "World Junior Athletics History" website.

Men

Women

Medal table (unofficial)

References

External links
World Junior Athletics History

South American U20 Championships in Athletics
2003 in Ecuadorian sport
South American U20 Championships
International athletics competitions hosted by Ecuador
2003 in youth sport